Burton Town F.C. was an English association football club based in Burton upon Trent in Staffordshire.  Originally known as Burton All Saints, the club competed in the Birmingham & District League, one of the country's strongest semi-professional leagues, between 1924 and 1935, winning the championship in the 1927–28 season, before joining the Midland Football League.  The club also competed in the FA Cup on a regular basis.  The club was never re-formed after the Second World War and merged into Burton Albion, shortly after the club was founded in 1950.

See also
:Category:Burton Town F.C. players
:Category:Burton Town F.C. managers

References

Defunct football clubs in England
Defunct football clubs in Staffordshire
Sport in Burton upon Trent
Association football clubs disestablished in the 1940s